Donald Evan McAllister was a Canadian ichthyologist who published over 625 scientific papers, books, popular articles and book reviews in his career, which lasted 45 years from 1958 until his early retirement in 1993.

References

External links
A tribute to Don E. McAllister
Obituaries
Some reflections on the life and work of Don E. McAllister

1934 births
2001 deaths
Canadian ichthyologists
People from Victoria, British Columbia
Scientists from British Columbia
20th-century Canadian zoologists